Sir James Crerar, KCSI, CIE (11 December 1877 – 29 August 1960) was a British administrator in India. A member of the Indian Civil Service, he was Home Member of the Viceroy's Executive Council from 1927 until 1932.

His son-in-law was Sir Hugh Lockhart-Mummery, Serjeant-Surgeon to The Queen.

References 
 

Alumni of the University of Edinburgh
1960 deaths
Knights Commander of the Order of the Star of India
Companions of the Order of the Indian Empire
People educated at George Watson's College
Alumni of Balliol College, Oxford
Indian Civil Service (British India) officers
Members of the Council of the Governor General of India